Viacom18 Media Private Limited is a Mumbai-based media company; it is a joint venture between Network18 Group—a subsidiary of Reliance Industries, and Paramount Global. It was founded in 2007 and owns various channels, as well as content production studios in India.

History 
In January 2010, Viacom18 went international with the launch of Colors in United States. The channel is called Aapka Colors. In July 2010, it got into 50/50 distribution joint venture with Sun Network to form Sun 18.

In December 2011, Viacom18 launched Nickelodeon Sonic, targeting young adults.

In January 2014, TV18 acquired the non-Telugu language TV assets of ETV Network for ₹2,053 crore, with a permission to use ETV brand name.

In March 2015, Viacom18 decided to rebrand all five non-Telugu language ETV regional general entertainment channels. ETV Marathi, ETV Gujarati, ETV Kannada, ETV Bangla and ETV Odia were rebranded into Colors Marathi, Colors Gujarati, Colors Kannada, Colors Bangla and Colors Odia respectively.

The company also owns Viacom18 Studios. On 31 January 2018, TV18 announced its acquisition of Viacom's majority in the joint venture, taking operational control and leaving Viacom with minority interest. On 1 October 2019, Viacom18 launched Colors HD in Malaysia on Astro Malaysia; every serial will be served with Malay and English subtitles.

More recently, the company had signed a deal with the National Basketball Association in order to deliver live NBA games to all of their own networks.

Merger attempts

Merger with Sony 
In June 2020, Sony's Indian unit Sony Pictures Networks India was in talks with Viacom18 about a merger, with the talks getting advanced much later. If the merger was successful, Sony would be 74% shareholder in the merged company. However, in October 2020, Reliance Industries, majority share holder in Viacom18, called off the merger.

Merger With Zee 
In June 2021, reports stated Viacom18 and Zee Entertainment Enterprises were reportedly in talks about a merger. However, Zee denied any talks about a potential merger with Viacom18, later entering talks with Sony Pictures Networks India, which was also in talks about a merger with Viacom18 earlier.

Merger with Lupa India 
In January 2022, there were reports that Lupa India, an investment company set up by Uday Shankar and James Murdoch, were in the final stages of picking up a 39% stake in Viacom18.  thereby turning Paramount Global into a minority share holder with a 10% share in the company. Instead, Viacom18 and Reliance Industries ultimately partnered with Bodhi Tree Systems, a company owned by Lupa Systems, to form a giant streaming and TV company. Bodhi Tree plans to invest US$1.8 billion in Viacom18, with Reliance investing US$216 million and Paramount Global continuing to be a shareholder in Viacom18; JioCinema will be transferred to Viacom18. The deal was approved by CCI in September 2022.

Channels and platforms

On-air channels
Following are the distribution channels available from TV18:

Upcoming channels

Over The Top (OTT) 
 Voot
Paramount+  (set to launch in 2023 in India)
JioCinema

See also
Paramount International Networks
Paramount Networks EMEAA
Network18 Group

References

External links
Official Site

 
Television stations in Mumbai
Mass media companies based in Mumbai
Network18 Group
Paramount International Networks
Television production companies of India
Mass media companies established in 2007
Indian companies established in 2007
Multinational joint-venture companies
Indian subsidiaries of foreign companies
2007 establishments in Maharashtra